Members of the New South Wales Legislative Council between 1976 and 1978 were indirectly elected by a joint sitting of the New South Wales Parliament, with 15 members elected every three years. The most recent election was on 27 November 1975, with the term of new members commencing on 23 April 1976. The terms of members were affected by the 1978 referendum which provided for the direct election of members of the Legislative Council. The members whose terms were due to expire in 1979 or 1982 had their terms expire at the next general election, held in 1978, those members whose terms were to expire in 1985 would retire at the second general election, held in 1981, and those members whose terms were to expire in 1988 would retire at the third general election, held in 1984.

The President was Sir Harry Budd.

See also
First Wran ministry

References

Members of New South Wales parliaments by term
20th-century Australian politicians